Benjamin Franklin Funk (October 17, 1838 – February 14, 1909) was a U.S. Representative from Illinois, father of Frank Hamilton Funk.

Biography
Born in Funk's Grove Township, McLean County, Illinois, Funk attended the public schools and Illinois Wesleyan University in Bloomington, Illinois. He was the son of Isaac Funk.

He left school in 1862 to enlist in the Sixty-eighth Regiment, Illinois Volunteer Infantry, as a private, and served five months during the Civil War.

After the war, he returned to the university and finished the course. After this, he engaged in agricultural pursuits.

He returned to Bloomington, in 1869, and served as its mayor from 1871 to 1876 and from 1884 to 1886. He also served as president of the board of trustees at Wesleyan University for twenty years, served as a delegate to the Republican National Convention in 1888 and was a trustee of the asylum for the blind in Jacksonville.

Funk was elected as a Republican to the Fifty-third Congress (March 4, 1893 – March 3, 1895). His candidacy for renomination in 1894 failed, so he returned to agriculture. He died on February 14, 1909, in Bloomington, Illinois. He is currently buried in Bloomington Cemetery.

References

1838 births
1909 deaths
Mayors of places in Illinois
Politicians from Bloomington, Illinois
Illinois Wesleyan University alumni
People of Illinois in the American Civil War
Union Army soldiers
Republican Party members of the United States House of Representatives from Illinois
19th-century American politicians